Svyatoslav Mikhailovich Sokol (22 March 1946 – 3 December 2022) was a Russian editor and politician. A member of the Communist Party of the Russian Federation, he served in the State Duma from 1995 to 2003 and again from 2007 to 2016.

Sokol died of a heart attack on 3 December 2022, at the age of 76.

References

1946 births
2022 deaths
Russian editors
Communist Party of the Russian Federation members
Russian communists
Second convocation members of the State Duma (Russian Federation)
Third convocation members of the State Duma (Russian Federation)
Fifth convocation members of the State Duma (Russian Federation)
Sixth convocation members of the State Duma (Russian Federation)
Secretariat of the Central Committee of the Communist Party of the Soviet Union members
People from Talachyn District